Christophe Pignol (born 15 October 1969) is a retired French football defender.

Personal life
Born in France, Pignol is of Spanish descent. Pignol's younger brother, Stéphane Pignol was also a professional footballer and a defender.

Honours
Trophée des Champions: 1997
Ligue 1: 1999–2000

References

1969 births
Living people
French footballers
French people of Spanish descent
AS Saint-Étienne players
FC Istres players
FC Nantes players
AS Monaco FC players
Lille OSC players
Association football defenders
Ligue 1 players
Ligue 2 players